Valeriy Sereda (born 30 June 1959) is a retired high jumper who represented the Soviet Union and later Azerbaijan. His personal best jump is 2.37 metres, achieved in September 1984 in Rieti, Italy. This is the current Azerbaijani record.

Achievements

References

External links

1959 births
Living people
Soviet male high jumpers
Azerbaijani high jumpers
Azerbaijani people of Ukrainian descent
Azerbaijani male athletes
Friendship Games medalists in athletics